Studies from an Eastern Home (1913) is an autobiographical book written by Sister Nivedita.

Background 
Nivedita met Swami Vivekananda in 1895 in London. From the first day of meeting with the Swami Nivedita considered him as a prophet. Vivekananda asked her to come to India and serve the nation. Responding to the call of Swami Vivekananda, Nivedita came to India in 1898 and served the nation as a social worker for the rest of her life. In this book Nivedita has described different incidences, memories and experiences of her life in India like Durga Puja, Dol-jatra, Ras–festival, the plague epidemic in Kolkata, Janmashtami celebration, her travel to northern India etc.

References

External links 
 Full book at Archive.org

1913 non-fiction books
Books by Sister Nivedita
English-language books
20th-century Indian books